Association Sportive de Carrefour (commonly referred to as AS Carrefour or ASCAR) is a professional football club based in Carrefour, Haiti. The club was promoted to the highest division of Haitian football for the first time in 2002. After 2011, Carrefour was relegated to Division 2, and again to Division 3 concluding the 2014 season.

References

Football clubs in Haiti
Ouest (department)